Satan's Cradle is a 1949 American Western film directed by Ford Beebe and written by J. Benton Cheney, and starring Duncan Renaldo, Leo Carrillo, Ann Savage, Douglas Fowley and Byron Foulger. It was released on October 7, 1949, by United Artists.

Plot

Cast 
Duncan Renaldo as the Cisco Kid
Leo Carrillo as Pancho
Ann Savage	as Lil
Douglas Fowley as Steve Gentry
Byron Foulger as Henry Lane
Claire Carleton as Belle
Buck Bailey as Henchman Rocky
George DeNormand as Henchman Idaho
Wes Hudman as Man shot by Rocky

References

External links 
 

Cisco Kid
1949 films
American black-and-white films
Films directed by Ford Beebe
United Artists films
American Western (genre) films
1949 Western (genre) films
Adaptations of works by O. Henry
Films scored by Albert Glasser
1940s English-language films
1940s American films